Aspidomorphus is a genus of venomous elapid snakes endemic to New Guinea and neighbouring islands. They are commonly called collared adders or crown snakes. These are small snakes with rounded snouts and small eyes. Very little is known about these nocturnal burrowing species.

Species

References

Further reading
McDowell SB (1967). "Aspidomorphus, a Genus of New Guinea Snakes of the Family Elapidae, With Notes on Related Genera". Journal of Zoology (London) 151: 497–543. Abstract.

External links
 
 

 
Snakes of New Guinea
Snake genera
Taxa named by Leopold Fitzinger
Endemic fauna of New Guinea